The Grand Design or some variant thereof may refer to:

Religion 
 A divine plan behind the creation of the cosmos

The Grand Design 
 "The Grand Design" (Yes, Prime Minister), an episode of the BBC television series Yes, Prime Minister
 The Grand Design (album), a 2006 album by Edenbridge
 The Grand Design (book), a book by Stephen Hawking and Leonard Mlodinow
 "Evolution (The Grand Design)", a song by Symphony X from their 2000 album V: The New Mythology Suite

Grand Design 
 Grand design spiral galaxy, a type of spiral galaxy
 Program for Action, a New York City Subway expansion plan also called the "Grand Design"
 , the project to integrate the Louvre Palace and Tuileries Palace in Paris into a single building, started with Henry IV's construction of the Grande Galerie and completed with Napoleon III's Louvre expansion
 Grand Design RV, a company manufacturing travel trailers and fifth wheel RVs.
 Groot Desseyn, a plan devised by the Dutch West India Company to seize the possessions of the Iberian Union in Africa and the Americas.

Grand Designs 
 Grand Designs, a British TV show
 "Grand Designs", a song by Rush from their 1985 album Power Windows